Fresnoy Mountain is located on the border of Alberta and British Columbia. It was named in 1919 after Fresnoy-en-Gohelle, a village in France, in commemoration of the World War I battle fought there by Canadian forces in 1917.

See also
 List of peaks on the British Columbia–Alberta border
 List of mountains in the Canadian Rockies

References

Three-thousanders of Alberta
Three-thousanders of British Columbia
Canadian Rockies